Civitas, also known as France Jeunesse Civitas and Institut Civitas, is an association generally considered to be a Traditionalist Catholic, integrist, nationalist, and of the extreme right. The association defines itself as a "Traditionalist Catholic lobby group". The group was once associated with the Society of St. Pius X but it has evolved under the new leadership of Alain Escada and the "chaplaincy" is now provided by Capuchin Friars of Morgon.

History 
Civitas was formed in 1999. It, and ICHTUS, were split out from the integrist Cité catholique movement.<ref>{{cite book|first=Étienne |last=Fouilloux|title=Les chrétiens français entre crise et libération: 1937-1947|language=fr|trans-title=French Christians between Crisis and Liberation: 1937-1947|publisher=Seuil|date=1997|page=268}}</ref> founded by the pro-Vichy intellectual Jean Ousset.

Its media prominence dates from the appointment of its current president, Alain Escada, a Belgian militant of the extreme right with a background of Traditionalist Catholicism and Belgian nationalism, and an ex-member of the New Belgian Front (FNB), of which he was expelled in 1997.

Escada became the secretary-general of Civitas in 2009. In 2012, he replaced François de Penfentenyo as president of Civitas.

At the start of 2013, Civitas claims  members and  "sympathisers" on its mailing list. Civitas had ambitions of winning 300 seats in the French municipal elections of 2014.

In 2016, Civitas announced a status change, from a cultural organization to a French political party. It is a major part of the Coalition pour la Vie et la Famille, a tiny European party.

 Aims 
Civitas promotes the rechristianisation of France and Europe. It defines itself as a social and political movement in the "Traditionalist Catholic lobby", a "movement whose cause is the restoration to society of the kingship of Our Lord Jesus Christ". It is not interested in taking part in abstract political theory, but instead teaches "techniques...useful in discussions on the subversive dialectic, learning fundamental skills for effective action: speaking in public meetings, launching associations, concrete action, etc."

For historian Étienne Fouilloux, this militant association, in promoting the establishment of the restoration of the Kingdom of Christ on Earth, is against republicanism and thus the French Republic itself:

 Activism 

 Opposition to theatrical performances 
Civitas came to public attention in 2011, in Paris, when it demonstrated for several consecutive evenings in opposition to the performance of some plays, notably Romeo Castellucci's  (original , "On the concept of the Son of God's face") at the Théâtre de la Ville — one performance was interrupted by militants who climbed on stage and threw eggs and waste oil over the audience — but also against the Théâtre du Rond-Point who were performing Rodrigo Garcia's Golgota Picnic, which they judged blasphemous.

Civitas denounced what it called "Christianophobia" and organised another, larger demonstration on 29 October 2011, while Cardinal André Vingt-Trois, the president of the Bishops' Conference of France, restated that the demonstrators  ("Had no mandate to defend the Church").

 Arrests and fines 
34 people were arrested for having disturbed the play Sur le concept du visage du fils de Dieu at the Théâtre de la Ville in Paris in October 2011. 32 were arrested and in June 2013 appeared before a Paris tribunal for "obstructing freedom of expression", which carries a fine of up to €5,000. Two defendants were found not guilty, three found guilty with fines of €1,500, €1,800 and €2,000, the others fined between €600 and €800.

 Opposition to same-sex marriage 

In June 2012, Civitas released a tract with the slogan  ("Would you trust your children with these men?"). On the photo, of a gay pride parade, one can see two naked men.

In November 2012, Civitas organised a march from the Ministry of the Family to the Assemblée Nationale, demonstrating against the policy of "Marriage for all"; according to police sources, nearly 8,000 people marched against "" ("gay madness").

On 13 January 2013, the association La Manif pour tous — organised to protest the proposed law allowing same-sex marriage, but which excluded Civitas — called for a national demonstration against the proposed law. Civitas militants, who had opposed the "Barjot concept", gathered to leave from the Place Pinel. They protested against same-sex marriage with the motto "Catholics for the Family". L'Express said there were "several thousand demonstrators".

 Opposition to "gender theory" 
At the end of January 2014, Civitas backed Farida Belghoul, who had initiated  ("stay away from school days") in protest against the supposed teaching of what she called "gender theory" (more often called Gender studies) in public establishments. In this context, Civitas was criticised for a photo series on its website showing a sex education teacher in compromising sexual positions. Accused by the Press and his opponents of spreading false rumours (the photo came from Canada), Civitas justified their actions by saying they did not have the means to authenticate its origins and it was not out of character for their chosen subject. In response, Le Monde published an article demonstrating that it was trivial and quick to authenticate the origin of the images.

A new row developed some days later, when Civitas called for harassment of the TV network Arte to prevent broadcast of the critically acclaimed film Tomboy'', which Civitas called "gender theory propaganda". Civitas stated that  ("This film does not fulfill Arte's mission as the 'inventor, maker and broadcaster of television programmes of a cultural nature'"). Civitas advocated protesting  ("Politely, but firmly, by telephone, fax or post").

Controversies 

Civitas' actions against the Romeo Castellucci play was deprecated by diverse groups including the Mayor of Paris and senior Catholic dignitaries.

Najat Vallaud-Belkacem, a Government spokesmen, said that Civitas' slogan  ("No to gay madness"), used at the November 2012 demonstration, was "misplaced". Other incidents occurred on the margins of the event. Some members of the feminist group FEMEN, topless and wearing a parody of a nun's habit, used powder fire extinguishers to spray demonstrators including, according to the organisers, children.. Journalist Caroline Fourest, an AFP photographer and FEMEN were attacked and some were beaten. The police made five arrests. After these incidents, six socialist  (elected politicians) demanded the break-up of Civitas.

According to the historian Galia Ackerman, it is part of Civitas' order of service to attack Femen. According to the writer René Guitton:

But according to Civitas, the demonstration was a "victim" of militant feminists. Siding with Civitas, Jacques Bompard, deputy mayor of Orange, denounced the feminists who, according to him, were responsible for the outbursts. Civitas said they had filed a complaint for exhibitionism. Caroline Fourest, one of those involved in the violence, also filed a complaint.

Publications
Civitas publishes a quarterly review entitled  ("Civitas – Catholic review of political and social questions"). It publishes news about the movement, and analyses the major political themes of the day.

Further reading

References

External links 

 Official Website
 Communiqués de Civitas

Political advocacy groups in France
Christian organizations based in France
1999 establishments in France
Organizations established in 1999
Traditionalist Catholicism
Catholicism and far-right politics